Mark Robinson (born 18 March 1963) is a South African martial artist and powerlifter. He is considered one of South Africa's most accomplished athletes with his most notable accomplishments being world champion in submission wrestling, sumo and powerlifting.

Background 
Robinson was born to a family of martial artists. His father, Norman Robinson, was one of the first practitioners of Shotokan Karate in South Africa and helped instigate the establishment of the South African branch of the Japan Karate Association. His grandfather, Jack Robinson, was a pioneer of judo in South Africa and set up an establishment that would later become Judo South Africa.

Grappling career 
Robinson's earliest sporting achievement was in 1982, when he became the South African Judo Champion in the heavyweight division. 

Robinson later started pursuing various forms of amateur wrestling including both Greco-Roman and Freestyle. From 1994 to 1996, he won multiple medals in wrestling at the African Wrestling Championship and African Games. His strong performance at the 1996 Acropolis Wrestling Grand Prix qualified him for a spot at the 1996 Summer Olympics in Greco-Roman wrestling. However, he was unable to compete due to budget restrictions.

Robinson competed in the 1996 Sumo World Championship with only a few months of training. In the finals he defeated Emmanuel Yarbrough to become champion of the openweight class.

Robinson competed at the 2001 ADCC Submission Fighting World Championship in the +99 kg category against many strong candidates. He defeated Valeriy Yureskul, Vitor Belfort and Ricco Rodriguez to reach the final. He defeated Jeff Monson in the final to become the tournament's champion.

Powerlifting career

Around the same time he started his grappling career, Robinson also participated in powerlifting.

He is a multiple time medalist at WPC World Championships including winner of the 1990 World Championship at the +140 kg category.

Personal Bests 

 Squat – 496/936.9 lb (Raw/Single)
 Bench press – 297.6/595.2 lb (Raw/Single)
 Deadlift – 545.6/821.2 lb (Raw/Single)
 Total – 1289.7/2353.4 lb (Raw/Single)

Mixed martial arts career
Robinson had a brief career in mixed martial arts.

On 26 August 2000, he fought for the promotion, World Extreme Fighting at the event WEF – New Blood Conflict. He faced Joe Leyva who and won by submission in less than 30 seconds.

On 23 February 2001, he fought for the promotion, Ultimate Fighting Championship at the event UFC 30. He faced Bobby Hoffman and was knocked out in the first round by a standing elbow strike. However Hoffman failed a drug test afterwards and the decision was changed to a no-contest.

Personal life
Robinson lives in Johannesburg with his wife Deirdre and daughter.

Robinson set up a martial arts academy in 2001 in South Africa.

Mixed martial arts record 

|-
| NC
| align=center| 1–0 (1)
| Bobby Hoffman
| NC (overturned)
| UFC 30
| 
| align=center| 1
| align=center| 3:27
| Atlantic City, New Jersey, United States
| 
|-
| Win
| align=center| 1–0
| Joe Leyva
| Submission (neck crank)
| WEF: New Blood Conflict
| 
| align=center| 1
| align=center| 1:22
| N/A
|

Submission wrestling record

External links

References 

Living people
1963 births
ADCC Submission Fighting World Champions (men)
Heavyweight mixed martial artists
Mixed martial artists utilizing judo
Mixed martial artists utilizing Sumo
South African male mixed martial artists
South African male sport wrestlers
South African powerlifters 
South African strength athletes
Ultimate Fighting Championship male fighters